Maarten Peeters or Marten Peeters van Ghelle ( – 1566) was a Flemish painter, print publisher and dealer active in Antwerp.

Peeters was born in Geel, Duchy of Brabant, around 1500. He was also called Martinus Petri, Merten Peters, and Marteen van Gheele. He moved to Antwerp, where he was active as a painter, print publisher and dealer. He was a member of the guild of traders (Meerseniers) in 1524/25. The following year he was reported as part of Antwerp's Guild of Saint Luke as a painter. He was the guild's dean in 1533, 1546, 1558. He was dean five times overall between 1533 and 1559. His son, Maarten II, was reported as wijnmeester, i.e. son of a master.

He was active as a publisher in the 1550s and 1560s. He was particularly interested in French and Italian art. He published plates after Francesco Primaticcio and works of Flemish artists influenced by the Italian style, and, among other things, republished nearly all the plates by Lucas van Leyden. He became the legal guardian of two sons of Pieter Coecke van Aelst, Michiel and future painter Pieter II. He was their warden through their minority.

He married Marie Jansdochter, daughter of Jan van der Haer and 	Gheertruyde Diericks Coevoet. His son, Maarten Peeters II, also a painter, married Johanna Reyns, the widow of painter Willem Key. Maarten II may have continued his father's business.

He died in Antwerp after 1565, probably around 1566 or shortly before.

References

Sources

Further reading
 

1500 births
Year of birth uncertain
1566 deaths
16th-century publishers (people)
Flemish publishers
Flemish printers
16th-century Flemish painters
People from Geel